The Duchy of Cornwall Office Act 1854 (17 & 18 Vict c 93) is an Act of the Parliament of the United Kingdom. It is a public general Act. It was omitted from the third revised edition of the statutes because of its local and personal nature.

This Act had not been wholly repealed in Great Britain at the end of 2010.

References

Halsbury's Statutes,
The Statutes of the United Kingdom of Great Britain and Ireland, 17 & 18 Victoria. 1854. Printed by Her Majesty's Printers. London. 1854. Pages 356 to 360. Digitised copy from Google Books.
HC Deb, vol 135, cols 587 to 591 (24 July 1854) and 1038 to 1045 (31 July 1854)  . 

United Kingdom Acts of Parliament 1854
Duchy of Cornwall
19th century in Cornwall